Aeroflot Flight 909 was a scheduled domestic flight overnight on 5/6 March 1976 flown by Ilyushin Il-18E registered CCCP-74508.  The aircraft lost control following an electrical failure and crashed near Voronezh in the Soviet Union. All 111 on board were killed.

Accident
The aircraft was on a domestic passenger flight between Moscow and Yerevan at flight level 260 (about ) when an electrical failure disabled some of the aircraft instruments including the compass and the two main gyros. Some people say that the aircraft may have collided with a military training airplane that had lost its way during a night flight. It was 00:58 in the dark and according to the official version without a natural horizon due to clouds the crew became confused on the orientation of the aircraft and control was lost and the aircraft crashed killing all on board. However, a number of experts affirm that it is difficult to believe that such a professional crew could lose control in these circumstances.  Some reports show that seven were killed on the ground.

Aircraft
The aircraft was a four-engined Ilyushin Il-18E turboprop built in 1966.

References

Aviation accidents and incidents in 1976
909
1976 in the Soviet Union
Accidents and incidents involving the Ilyushin Il-18
Aviation accidents and incidents in the Soviet Union
Airliner accidents and incidents caused by electrical failure
March 1976 events in Europe